Bernard Skinner may refer to:
 Bernard Skinner (sailor)
 Bernard Skinner (entomologist)